Marieke Lo (born 10 September 1972) is a Senegalese former basketball player who competed in the 2000 Summer Olympics. She was born in Dakar. Her work has since expanded to academic pursuits, and she went on to create the School of Cities at the University of Toronto, where she is the Director of African studies, and holds a professorial position in Women and Gender Studies.

References

1972 births
Living people
Basketball players from Dakar
Senegalese women's basketball players
Olympic basketball players of Senegal
Basketball players at the 2000 Summer Olympics